Coleophora amethystinella is a moth of the family Coleophoridae, found in Asia and Europe.

Taxonomy
The species was previously considered to be a synonym of Coleophora fuscicornis.

Description
The length of the forewings is 7–8.5 mm for males and 6.5–7 mm for females. Adults are dark glossy green, with distinctive orange eyelashes, if observed closely. Adults are on wing in June in western Europe.

The larvae feed on smooth tare (Vicia tetrasperma). They feed within the seedpods of their host plant, living within a movable case with a length of 9–11 mm.

Distribution
The moth has a disjunct distribution being found in the Mediterranean region from Portugal to Iraq. It was first recorded from Essex,  England in 1973 and has since been found elsewhere in southern England.

References

External links

Amethystinella
Moths described in 1885
Moths of Asia
Moths of Europe
Taxa named by Émile Louis Ragonot